Michael Harper may refer to:

Michael Harper (cricketer) (born 1945), South African cricketer
Michael Harper (priest) (1931–2010), English charismatic Anglican, later an Orthodox priest
Michael S. Harper (1938–2016), African-American poet
Mike Harper (born 1966), American racecar driver
Mike Harper (basketball) (born 1957), retired American basketball player
Michael Harper (My Family), a character in the British TV series My Family
C. Michael Harper (1927–2016), American businessman
Michael Harper (American football) (born 1961), football player